The Indian cricket team toured England in the 1952 season. The team played four Test matches, losing three of them and drawing the other one. In all first-class matches, they played 29, winning four and losing five, with the rest drawn. At the first Test in Headingley, India lost four wickets for no runs at the start of their second innings.

This was the first tour of India to England after Independence from United Kingdom

The Indian team
There were 17 players in the original touring team, and Vinoo Mankad was co-opted from the Lancashire League team Haslingden for three of the four Test matches. The side was captained by Vijay Hazare.

The Test matches

First Test
India (293 and 165) lost to England (334 and 128 for three) by seven wickets – scorecard

Second Test

Third Test

Fourth Test

India were at 49/5 at the end of second day. The third day was washed out. On fourth day, only 65 minutes were played, during which India were all out for 98, third consecutive innings that they failed to reach 100. Hutton asked them to follow-on. But no further play was possible that day, and the fifth and last day was also completely washed out.

References

Annual reviews
 Playfair Cricket Annual 1953
 Wisden Cricketers' Almanack 1953

Further reading
 Ramachandra Guha, A Corner of a Foreign Field - An Indian History of a British Sport, Picador, 2001

External links
 CricketArchive

1952 in English cricket
1952
International cricket competitions from 1945–46 to 1960